Jahtari is a netlabel, founded in 2004 by Jan Gleichmar aka "disrupt". Unlike most netlabels, it focuses on the dub and reggae music genres, with an electronic music approach which it calls "digital laptop reggae". According to The List, "the name is an amalgam of ‘Jah’ and ‘Atari’, and a similar lo-fi 8-bit aesthetic informs their branding and design."

From their site:
"We are a small record label based in Leipzig/Germany and we produce a kind of music here which we call - for the lack of a better term - DIGITAL LAPTOP REGGAE (DLR).This means nothing else but that we produce first and above all REGGAE music (or DUB) in its classical sense, which in itself is nothing new, but since we're having a background of mostly electronic music we're doing this with the only tool that is obvious to use for that purpose - a COMPUTER, and a computer only."

Jan Gleichmar has been working as a camera assistant. By 2006, Jahtari had started to offer a release on CD in addition to the free downloads, and later produced vinyl releases too. As of 2008, it had signed more than 20 artists, among them London-based Mikey Murka (a veteran of 1980s digital reggae).

References

External links 
 Jahtari.org, with Jahtari Magazine (a collection of articles about the history of Reggae music, also run by the Netlabel)
 solipsistic NATION No. 24: Jahtari Podcast. Interview with Jahtari founder Jan Gleichmar, plus music from the label. February 9, 2007
 The Jah of 8-Bit-Chip-Dub-Digital-Laptop-Reggae-Music Portrait of Jahtari on Phlow-Magazine.com

German record labels
Netlabels
Electronic music record labels
Reggae record labels
Online music stores of Germany